Stones Corner is an unincorporated community in Wagoner County, Oklahoma, United States. It is located at the junction of Oklahoma State highways 51B and 104, approximately 4 1/2 miles west of Porter, and seven miles south of Coweta. Primarily a farming community, it once was home to a farm equipment dealer and repair shop, and Stones Corner filling station and grocery, until the latter burned down in the late 1980s.

References

Unincorporated communities in Oklahoma
Unincorporated communities in Wagoner County, Oklahoma